WWE Afterburn is an American syndicated television program which recaps events taking place on WWE's weekly flagship program, SmackDown. Along with Bottom Line, it replaced WWE's previous syndicated highlight show, Jakked. The show ran from May 2002 until September 2005 domestically, broadcasting 172 episodes domestically before being removed from syndication. The show continues to run in some international markets such as South Africa, Italy, Germany, Spain and South Asia.

International variations

Malaysia, and South Africa
In Malaysia, Afterburn debuted on May 6, 2011. It aired every Monday at 10pm on Astro SuperSport 4, but now on Astro Prima every Thursday at 11pm. The show airs on eKasi+ in South Africa on Fridays at 10pm.

Australia
In Australia, WWE Afterburn debuted in 2008 on Channel Nine. Afterburn was the only free-to-air WWE show in Australia at the time, with Raw, SmackDown, NXT and Superstars all airing on Fox8. Afterburn had a time slot 1pm every Sunday, before being moved to 12am every Tuesday. WWE Afterburn aired 132 episodes in Australia before being removed from syndication on July 28, 2010. Afterburn was replaced with a similar show titled WWE Experience starting November 4 however in December 2014, Afterburn returned and was broadcast on 7mate.

Hosts

Fill in guest hosts

Broadcast
WWE Afterburn was broadcast from May 2002 to September 2005, before it was removed from syndication in the US. The show still airs in international markets to fulfil programming commitments.

See also

List of current WWE programming

References

Afterburn
Afterburn
2002 American television series debuts
2010s American television series
First-run syndicated television programs in the United States
English-language television shows